Karolinelund was a Danish public park located in Aalborg, Denmark.  Located at the Eastern end of the city centre, it hosted an amusement park.

History
Karolinelund was founded in 1946 by the brothers Volmer and Carl Lind and was later owned by Franck Bo Lind. In 2005, Lind sold the park to Torben "Træsko" Pedersen, who owned amusement facilities at Dyrehavsbakken. After only one season, Pedersen sold the park to Aalborg Kommune on 23 January 2007.

The park was called Tivoliland from the 1970s to 2005. When Pedersen bought the park in 2005, he changed the name to Tivoli Karolinelund and it later became known as, simply, Karolinelund, the original name of the area where the park is located.

The park closed after the 2010 season.

Amusement parks in Denmark
Defunct amusement parks
1946 establishments in Denmark
Buildings and structures in Aalborg
Tourist attractions in Aalborg
2010 disestablishments in Denmark
Amusement parks opened in 1946
Amusement parks closed in 2010